Pierre Andreu (12 July 1909 – 25 March 1987) was a French journalist, essayist, biographer and poet.

Life

Pierre Andreu was born in 1909 in Carcassonne, Aude.
As a student he was interested in Charles Péguy, Pierre-Joseph Proudhon and Georges Sorel.
He later wrote an essay on Sorel.
He was a friend of Pierre Drieu La Rochelle.
In the 1930s Andreu was also close to Emmanuel Mounier, founder of the review Esprit, and supported the Cartel des Gauches.
Later he became strongly anti-Communist.
In 1934 he launched a review with Bertrand de Jouvenel called La Lutte des jeunes (The Struggle of the Young).
By the end of the 1930s Andreu called himself a Fascist. 
Despite this, he remained close to Max Jacob.

Andreu joined Radiodiffusion française after World War II (1939–45).
The journal Accent grave (revue de l'Occident) was launched in 1963 and ran to less than a dozen issues.
It included Paul Sérant, Pierre Andreu, Michel Déon, Roland Laudenbach and Philippe Héduy on its board.  
The journal followed the ideas of Charles Maurras and had the theme of the crisis of western civilization.
Andreu was director of the ORTF office in Beirut from 1966 to 1970, where he came into contact with Arab and Palestinian intellectuals.
He contributed to Jean José Marchand's Archives du XXe siècle.
He then became director of the radio channel France Culture.

In 1982 the Académie française awarded Andreu the 15,000 francs Prix de l'essai for his Vie et mort de Max Jacob.
Towards the end of his life Andreu moved towards the left and supported François Mitterrand.
He was a friend of Pierre Vidal-Naquet and Jacques Julliard, with whom he directed the Cahiers Georges Sorel.
He became deeply pacifist and interested in ecology.
Pierre Andreu died in 1987 at the age of 77.

Works

Notes

Sources

1909 births
1987 deaths
People from Carcassonne
20th-century French journalists
20th-century French poets